BPK may refer to:

 Brookmans Park railway station, Hertfordshire, National Rail station code
 Bruton's tyrosine kinase
 Audit Board of Indonesia (Indonesian: Badan Pemeriksa Keuangan), Indonesian government body responsible for evaluation and accountability of state finances